Yarbaşı is a belde (town) in Düziçi district of Osmaniye Province, Turkey. It is on the Osmaniye-Düziçi highway. The population of Yarbaşı is 3,544 as of 2010.

References

Populated places in Osmaniye Province
Towns in Turkey
Düziçi District